(Peter) Rigby Wason (1797 – 24 July 1875) was a Scottish barrister and farmer, and a Whig politician.  He was Member of Parliament (MP) for Ipswich in Suffolk from 1831 until his defeat at the 1835 general election. However, the election was declared void on petition, and he was returned to the House of Commons at the resulting by-election, holding the seat until he was defeated again at the 1837 general election.

He regained the seat at the 1841 general election, but that election was overturned on petition and he did not stand again.

Wason married Euphemia McTier.  Their children included Cathcart Wason (1848–1921), a New Zealand settler and MP who returned to Scotland and became MP for Orkney and Shetland, and Eugene Wason (1846–1927), a lawyer and Liberal MP. Peter Cathcart Wason was Eugene's grandchild.

References

External links 
 

1797 births
1875 deaths
British barristers
Whig (British political party) MPs
Members of the Parliament of the United Kingdom for Ipswich
UK MPs 1831–1832
UK MPs 1832–1835
UK MPs 1835–1837